Breathless is the sixth studio album by the English progressive rock band Camel, released in 1978. It is the last album to feature the group's original keyboardist, Peter Bardens, who left the group before the tour for the album.

The album focuses on shorter, radio-friendly pop songs while retaining their progressive rock sound.

Track listing
Side one
"Breathless" (Andrew Latimer, Peter Bardens, Andy Ward) – 4:21
"Echoes" (Latimer, Bardens, Ward) – 7:21
"Wing and a Prayer" (Latimer, Bardens) – 4:46
"Down on the Farm" (Richard Sinclair) – 4:25
"Starlight Ride" (Latimer, Bardens) – 3:26

Side two
"Summer Lightning" (Latimer, Sinclair) – 6:10
"You Make Me Smile" (Latimer, Bardens) – 4:18
"The Sleeper" (Latimer, Bardens, Ward, Mel Collins) – 7:08
"Rainbow's End" (Latimer, Bardens) – 3:01

2009 Expanded & Remastered Edition
"Rainbow's End" (Single version) - 2:59

Personnel
Camel
 Andrew Latimer – guitar, Yamaha CS-50 & CS-80 synthesizers; vocals on "Echoes", "Starlight Ride", "You Make Me Smile" and "Rainbow's End"
 Peter Bardens – keyboards, organ; vocals on "Wing and a Prayer"
 Richard Sinclair – bass;  Lead vocals on "Breathless", "Down on the Farm" and "Summer Lightning"
 Andy Ward – drums, percussion
 Mel Collins – flute, oboe, saxophones

Additional personnel
Dave Sinclair – synthesizer on "You Make Me Smile", piano on "Rainbow's End"
Jan Schelhaas – clavinet on "You Make Me Smile"

Production
 Engineered by Mick Glossop
 Artwork by Michael Munday & CREAM

Charts

References

The Rough Guide to Rock (2nd ed.). Rough Guides Ltd. 1999. p. 165.

External links
 Camel - Breathless (1978) album review by Daevid Jehnzen, credits & releases at AllMusic.com
 
 Camel - Breathless (1978) album review by Killerhit, credits & user reviews at SputnikMusic.com
 Camel - Breathless (1978) album to be listened as stream at Play.Spotify.com

1978 albums
Camel (band) albums
Deram Records albums